John Ganzoni may refer to:
 John Ganzoni, 1st Baron Belstead, British politician and peer
 John Ganzoni, 2nd Baron Belstead, his son, British politician and peer